Aughnacloy, sometimes spelt Auchnacloy (Irish: Achadh na Cloiche (field of the stone)) is a village in County Tyrone, Northern Ireland. Close to the border with County Monaghan in the Republic of Ireland, the village is about 20 km southwest of Dungannon, and 7 km southeast of Ballygawley. It is situated in the historic barony of Dungannon Lower and the civil parish of Carnteel. In the 2011 Census it had a population of 1,045.

History
Much of the town was built in the 18th Century by Acheson Moore, the local landlord. Because he backed the Jacobite cause, he planted his estate in the shape of a thistle and planned out the town on the edge of it. Unable to rename it "Mooretown", he had to settle for naming the main street "Moore Street", and the side streets Sydney, Lettice, and Henrietta (now Ravella Road), after his three wives. The thistle is still visible from the air.

Aughnacloy served as an important staging post on the road to Derry. However, lacking large-scale industry, it started to wane in the late 19th century.

The Troubles
In 1988, Aidan McAnespie, a Catholic civilian was killed by a bullet from a general purpose machine-gun held by a British Army soldier at Aughnacloy. In June 2008, the Police Service of Northern Ireland Historical Enquiries Team published its findings on the case in a report.

Demographics

2011 Census
At the time of the 2011 census (27 March 2011), Aughnacloy had a population of 1,045, accounting for 0.06% of the total NI population. Of those 1,045 people:
 
99.14% were from the white (including Irish Traveller) ethnic group
56.84% belong to or were brought up in the Catholic religion and 41.34% belong to or were brought up in a 'Protestant and Other Christian (including Christian related)' religion
35.41% indicated that they had a British national identity, 30.62% had an Irish national identity and 22.39% had a Northern Irish national identity*.
14.81% had some knowledge of Irish
5.17% had some knowledge of Ulster-Scots
15.62% did not have English as their first language

Transport
Aughnacloy had its own railway station on the Clogher Valley Railway (CVR) from 2 May 1887 to 1 January 1942. The CVR's headquarters and locomotive workshop was also at Aughnacloy. Current proposals to upgrade the A5 road through the village to a dual carriageway and build a bypass have met with a mixed reaction in the town, with many traders and farmers strongly opposed. 

The town is served by Bus Eireann Expressway Route 32, connecting the town to both Dublin and Letterkenny.

Education
 Aughnacloy Primary School
 Aughnacloy College (former names: Aughnacloy Secondary School;  Aughnacloy High School) opened in 1963, designed by John MacGeagh. It occupies a rural site on the outskirts of Aughancloy, serving a catchment area stretching along the Blackwater valley including Caledon, Greystone, Innismagh, Ballygawley, Lisdoart and Favour Royal
 St. Mary's Primary School, Aughnacloy

Sport
Aghaloo O'Neills – Gaelic Athletic Association club.
 Aughnacloy Golf Club – one of the founder clubs of the Golfing Union of Ireland in 1890; reformed in 1994 and currently based at Lissenderry just outside the village
 Aughnacloy Races – The ancient tradition of horse racing has been re-established in recent years

See also
Market Houses in Northern Ireland

References

Sources

 Dungannon & South Tyrone Area Plan 2010

Villages in County Tyrone
Civil parish of Carnteel